Kingsfield may refer to:

Characters 
Professor Charles Kingsfield, a fictional character in the John Jay Osborn, Jr. 1970 novel, The Paper Chase, as well as the film version

Places 
Kingsfield, Herefordshire, England
Kingsfield, Maine, USA

Other uses 
Kingsfield College, a Nigerian high school and junior high school
Kingsfield University, an unaccredited consortium of diploma mills